The Republic of Poland Ambassador to Bulgaria is the Poland's foremost diplomatic representative in Bulgaria, and in charge of the Polish diplomatic mission in Sofia.

As with all Poland Ambassadors, the ambassador to Bulgaria is nominated by the President of Poland and confirmed by the Prime Minister and Parliamentary Commission of the Foreign Affairs. The ambassador serves at the pleasure of the president, and enjoys full diplomatic immunity.

The Embassy of Poland is located in Sofia, additionally there is Honorary Consulate located in Nesebar.

List of ambassadors of Poland to Bulgaria

Second Polish Republic 

 1918–1925 – Tadeusz Stanisław Grabowski (Envoy)
 1925–1930 – Władysław Baranowski (Envoy)
 1930–1941 – Adam Tarnowski (Envoy)

Polish People's Republic 

 1945–1948 – Edmund Zalewski (Envoy)
 1948 – Stefan Chanachowicz (chargé d'affaires a.i.)
 1948–1953 – Aleksander Barchacz
 1953–1956 – Marian Szczepański
 1956–1957 – Leon Szyguła
 1957–1964 – Aleksander Juszkiewicz
 1964–1970 – Ryszard Nieszporek
 1970–1973 – Jerzy Szyszko
 1973–1978 – Józef Muszyński
 1978–1981 – Lucjan Motyka
 1981–1986 – Władysław Napieraj
 1986–1990 – Wiesław Bek

Third Polish Republic 

 1990–1991 – Władysław Pożoga
 1991–1997 – Tadeusz Wasilewski
 1997–1998 – Romuald Kunat
 1998–2003 – Jarosław Lindenberg
 2003–2006 – Sławomir Dąbrowa
 2006–2007 – Irena Tatarzyńska (chargé d'affaires)
 2007–2010 – Andrzej Papierz
 2010–2014 – Leszek Hensel
 2014–2018 – Krzysztof Krajewski
 since 2019 – Maciej Szymański

References 

Bulgaria
Poland